Force Commander can refer to:

 Force commander (military), a command post in several armed forces or multinational forces; see Area of responsibility
 Star Wars: Force Commander